Pre-Samnite was an ancient language spoken in southern Campania, in Italy. The name Pre-Samnite refers to the fact that the language was spoken in early times in an area that was later colonised by Samnites, who spoke Oscan. Pre-Samnite is recorded in a few short inscriptions dating from around 500 BC. The language belongs to the Sabellian group of languages, and may be closely related to Oscan, but shows a number of archaic features which were lost from Oscan. However, the material is too scanty to enable a precise determination of the relation of Pre-Samnite either to Oscan or to the other Sabellian languages.

References

Further reading
 Xavier-Adiego, Ignacio. “Some remarks on the new Opic ("Pre-Samnite") inscription of Niumsis Tanunis”. In: Incontri linguistici 38, 2015, 125-138.

Osco-Umbrian languages
Samnites